The United Nations Educational, Scientific and Cultural Organization (UNESCO) World Heritage Sites are places of importance to cultural or natural heritage as described in the UNESCO World Heritage Convention, established in 1972. Cultural heritage consists of monuments (such as architectural works, monumental sculptures, or inscriptions), groups of buildings, and sites (including archaeological sites). Natural features (consisting of physical and biological formations), geological and physiographical formations (including habitats of threatened species of animals and plants), and natural sites which are important from the point of view of science, conservation or natural beauty, are defined as natural heritage.  The Soviet Union ratified the convention on 12 October 1988. Five sites were inscribed to the list at the 14th session of the UNESCO World Heritage Committee, held in Banff, Alberta, Canada, in 1990. The Soviet Union collapsed in 1991 and from then on the sites are managed by the successor states. Three of these five sites are now in Russia and one each in Ukraine and Uzbekistan. 


World Heritage Sites 
UNESCO lists sites under ten criteria; each entry must meet at least one of the criteria. Criteria i through vi are cultural, and vii through x are natural.

See also
List of World Heritage Sites in Russia
List of World Heritage Sites in Ukraine
List of World Heritage Sites in Uzbekistan

References

Soviet Union
Soviet culture